High Stakes may refer to:

Film and television 
 High Stakes (1918 film), an American film directed by Arthur Hoyt
 High Stakes (1931 film), an early talkie and the last film for silent actress Mae Murray
 High Stakes (1989 film), a thriller, debut film of Sarah Michelle Gellar
 High Stakes (1997 film), a TV movie starring Cynthia Gibb
 Sharpay's Fabulous Adventure (working title: High Stakes), a 2011 Disney film starring Ashley Tisdale
 High Stakes (game show), a 2011 British television game show
 High Stakes (TV series), a 2001 British television sitcom

Literature 
 High Stakes (Nancy Drew/Hardy Boys), a 1996 young-adult mystery novel
 High Stakes (Cabot novel) or Ninth Key, a 2004 Mediator novel by Meg Cabot
 High Stakes, a 1975 novel by Dick Francis

Music 
 High Stakes (album), or the title song, by Michael Martin Murphey, 2016
 "High Stakes", a song by Bryson Tiller from True to Self
 "High Stakes", a song by Mob Figaz from C-Bo's Mob Figaz

Sports and games 
 High Stakes (video game), a 1986 PC booter game based on the Dick Francis novel
 Need for Speed: High Stakes, a 1999 racing video game
 PFC 12: High Stakes, a 2009 Palace Fighting Championship mixed martial arts event